This article contains information about the literary events and publications of 1769.

Events
January 21 – The first of the Letters of Junius criticising the government appears in the Public Advertiser (London). The identity of Junius remains a mystery, but modern-day scholarly consensus favours Philip Francis.
February–April – John Wilkes is expelled from the Parliament of Great Britain three times.
May – One of 16-year-old Thomas Chatterton's poems attributed to the imaginary medieval monk "Thomas Rowley" – Elinoure and Juga – first appears in Alexander Hamilton's Town and Country Magazine. This year also Chatterton sends specimens of "Rowley"'s poetry and history The Ryse of Peyncteynge yn Englade to Horace Walpole, who at first offers to print them, but discovering Chatterton's age, rightly considers they may be forgeries and scornfully dismisses him.
September 5–7 – English actor-manager David Garrick stages a Shakespeare Jubilee festival in Stratford-upon-Avon (with no performances of Shakespeare's works). On October 14 a version opens at the Theatre Royal, Drury Lane in London as The Jubilee.
unknown date – Jean-François Ducis stages his version of Shakespeare's Hamlet in Paris.

New books

Fiction
Elizabeth Bonhôte – Hortensia, or, The Distressed Wife
Frances Brooke – The History of Emily Montague (the first novel written in Canada)
Elizabeth Griffith – The Delicate Distress (published together with Richard Griffith – The Gordian Knot)
Charles Jenner – The Placid Man
Susannah Minifie – The Cottage
Nicolas-Edme Rétif – Le Pied de Fanchette
Tobias Smollett – The History and Adventures of an Atom
William Tooke – The Loves of Othniel and Achsah

Poetry

Basílio da Gama – O Uraguai
Thomas Gray – Ode Performed in the Senate-House at Cambridge
Clara Reeve – Poems

Drama
Mary Bowes, Countess of Strathmore and Kinghorne – The Siege of Jerusalem (published)
Richard Cumberland – The Brothers
Ramón de la Cruz – El Manolo
Alexander Dow – Zingis
Jean-François Ducis – Hamlet (an adaptation of Shakespeare)
David Garrick – The Jubilee
Elizabeth Griffith – The School for Rakes (an adaptation of Beaumarchais' Eugenie)
John Home – The Fatal Discovery
Charlotte Lennox – The Sister

Non-fiction
William Blackstone – A Reply to Dr. Priestley
Charles Bonnet – Palingénésie philosophique
William Buchan – Domestic Medicine
Edmund Burke – Observations on a Late State of the Nation
Charles Burney – An Essay Towards a History of the Principal Comets that have Appeared Since 1742
William Falconer – An Universal Dictionary of the Marine
Adam Ferguson – Institutes of Moral Philosophy
Junius
The Political Contest i–ii
The Letters from Junius to the D***of G***** (Duke of Grafton)
Oliver Goldsmith – The Roman History (textbook)
James Granger – Biographical History of England from Egbert the Great to the Revolution
Johann Gottfried Herder – Kritische Wälder
Elizabeth Montagu – An Essay on the Writings and Genius of Shakespear
Joshua Reynolds – A Discourse
William Robertson – The History of the Reign of the Emperor Charles V
Laurence Sterne
A Political Romance
Sermons by the Late Rev. Mr. Sterne

Births
January 1 – Jane Marcet, née Haldimand, English science writer (died 1858)
February 9 – Susette Borkenstein Gontard, German lover of poet Friedrich Hölderlin (died 1802)
March 7 – Richmal Mangnall, English schoolbook writer (died 1820)
May 21 – John Hookham Frere, English diplomat and author (died 1846)
September 9 (August 29 O.S.) – Ivan Kotliarevsky, Ukrainian writer (died 1838)
September 14 – Alexander von Humboldt, German explorer, natural philosopher and educator (died 1859)
November 12 – Amelia Opie, English novelist (died 1853)
December 7 (baptised) – Ann Batten Cristall, English poet (died 1848)
December 26 – Ernst Moritz Arndt, German patriotic author and poet (died 1860)

Deaths
January 5 – James Merrick, English poet and scholar (born 1720)
February 26 – William Duncombe, English dramatist and author (born 1690)
March 28 – Samuel Derrick, British hack writer (born 1724)
July – Goronwy Owen, Welsh-language poet (born 1723)
October 25 – Owen Ruffhead, English miscellanist and editor (born 1723)
December 13 – Christian Fürchtegott Gellert, German poet (born 1715)
December 16 – Lady Elizabeth Germain, English philanthropist, correspondent of Jonathan Swift (born 1680)

References

 
Years of the 18th century in literature